Perfecto Bobadilla (born 18 April 1956) is a Paraguayan boxer. He competed in the men's light middleweight event at the 1984 Summer Olympics.

References

1956 births
Living people
Paraguayan male boxers
Olympic boxers of Paraguay
Boxers at the 1984 Summer Olympics
Place of birth missing (living people)
Light-middleweight boxers